Abet may refer to:

 Aiding and abetting, a legal doctrine
 Abet Guidaben (born 1952), Filipino basketball player

See also
 Abettor
 ABET